This article presents a list of the historical events and publications of Australian literature during 1885.

Books 

 Francis Adams — Leicester : An Autobiography
 Rolf Boldrewood
 The Crooked Stick, or, Pollie's Probation
 The Sealskin Cloak
 Ada Cambridge — A Little Minx : A Sketch
 Rosa Praed
 Affinities : A Romance of To-Day
 The Head Station : A Novel of Australian Life

Poetry 

 Victor Daley
 "On the River"
 "On the Shore"
 George Essex Evans — "Australia Militant"
 Mary Hannay Foott
 "Happy Days"
 "No Message"
 Where the Pelican Builds and Other Poems
 Philip J. Holdsworth — "My Queen of Dreams"
 Henry Parkes — The Beauteous Terrorist and Other Poems
 A. B. Paterson — "El Mahdi to the Australian Troops"
 J. Brunton Stephens — Convict Once and Other Poems

Short stories 

 Rolf Boldrewood
 "A Canvas Town Romance"
 "A Transformation Scene"
 Rosa Praed — Australian Life, Black and White

Births 

A list, ordered by date of birth (and, if the date is either unspecified or repeated, ordered alphabetically by surname) of births in 1885 of Australian literary figures, authors of written works or literature-related individuals follows, including year of death.

 13 June – Henry George Lamond, novelist (died 1969)
 1 July – Dorothea Mackellar, poet (died 1968)
 18 August – Nettie Palmer, critic (died 1959)
 28 August – Vance Palmer, novelist (died 1959)
18 September – Edward George Honey, journalist (died 1922 in England)

Deaths 

A list, ordered by date of death (and, if the date is either unspecified or repeated, ordered alphabetically by surname) of deaths in 1885 of Australian literary figures, authors of written works or literature-related individuals follows, including year of birth.

Unknown date
 Ellen Liston, schoolteacher, short story writer and poet (born 1838 in England)

See also 
 1885 in Australia
 1885 in literature
1885 in poetry
 List of years in Australian literature
List of years in literature

References

Literature
Australian literature by year
19th-century Australian literature
1885 in literature